Eli Ethelbert Rosebraugh  (typically spelled Rosebrough during his career) (September 8, 1875 – July 16, 1930) was a professional baseball player. According to a Sporting Life article from June 18, 1898, he threw a no-hitter with the Dayton Old Soldiers. The Pirates bought Rosebraugh for $700 on July 31,1898. He coached at Oberlin College for part of 1899.

On July 16, 1930, Rosebraugh committed suicide by shooting himself. He was buried in Washington Colony Cemetery, Fresno, California.

References

External links

1875 births
1930 suicides
Major League Baseball pitchers
Baseball players from Illinois
Pittsburgh Pirates players
19th-century baseball players
Dayton Old Soldiers players
Mansfield Haymakers players
Dayton Veterans players
Youngstown Little Giants players
Marion Glass Blowers players
People from Charleston, Illinois
Suicides by firearm in California
Burials in California